Kay (also Romanized as Kāy; also known as Kā'ī) is a village in Dasht Rural District, Silvaneh District, Urmia County, West Azerbaijan Province, Iran. At the 2006 census, its population was 299, in 45 families.

References 

Populated places in Urmia County